The B90 Nuclear Depth Strike Bomb (NDSB) was an American thermonuclear bomb designed at Lawrence Livermore National Labs in the mid-to-late 1980s and cancelled prior to introduction into military service due to the end of the Cold War.

The B90 design was intended for use as a naval aircraft weapon, for use as a nuclear depth bomb and as a land attack strike bomb. It was intended to replace the B57 nuclear bomb used by the Navy. The B90 bomb design entered Phase 3 development engineering and was assigned its numerical designation in June 1988.

The B90's yield has been described at both  and "low kt". This may indicate a variable yield weapon.

The B90 was cancelled in September 1991 along with the W89 and W91 nuclear warheads and AGM-131 SRAM II and SRAM-T missile models. No B90 production models were built, though test units may have been; US nuclear weapon testing continued until 1992.

See also
 List of nuclear weapons

References

External links
 University of California 1989 nuclear weapons labs status report
 Allbombs.html at the Nuclear Weapon Archive at nuclearweaponarchive.org

Nuclear bombs of the United States
Cold War aerial bombs of the United States
Depth charges